The Greens (De Grønne) was a Danish green party. It was founded in October 1983. It first participated in the 1985 local elections. It was a founding member of the European Green Party.

In 2008 the party was expelled from the EGP. The reason was that De Grønne intended to cooperate with the People's Movement against the EU in the upcoming elections which sits in the European United Left–Nordic Green Left parliamentary group instead of the European Greens–European Free Alliance-group.

In 2014 the party discussed the own future with among the options dissolution of the party or changing it into a foundation. The party was dissolved in December 2014. Some former members are trying to form a new Danish Green party – Det Grønne Parti i Danmark. In 2015 the official website appeared to be removed.

See also

Green party
Green politics
List of environmental organizations

References

1983 establishments in Denmark
2014 disestablishments in Denmark
Defunct political parties in Denmark
Green political parties in Denmark
Political parties established in 1983
Political parties disestablished in 2014